Ramjipura is a small heritage village in the district of Sikar in Rajasthan state of India.

Etymology
Ramjipura gets its name after the Hindu God Lord Rama.

References

Villages in Sikar district